Svaté Pole is a municipality and village in Příbram District in the Central Bohemian Region of the Czech Republic. It has about 500 inhabitants.

Administrative parts
The village of Budínek is an administrative part of Svaté Pole.

Geography
It lies in an agricultural landscape in the Benešov Uplands. There are several ponds in the municipal territory, the largest of them is Svatopolský.

History
The first written mention of Svaté Pole is from 1352.

Transport
The D4 motorway passes through the municipality.

Sights
The landmark of Obořiště is the Church of Saint Elizabeth of Thuringia. It was originally a medieval Gothic church, rebuilt in the Baroque style in 1710–1721. The reconstruction was inspired by the Church of San Carlo alle Quattro Fontane in Rome.

References

External links

Villages in Příbram District